Periyapatna is a Town located in Peiriyapatna taluka of Mysore district. The town is divided into 23 wards in which elections are held every 5 years.

Location 

It has an average elevation of 849 metres (2769 feet). The town is situated on Mangalore-Mysore-Bangalore highway (NH275) at a distance of 70 km from Mysore. The town is nearby Kushalanagar of Kodagu district.

Rehabilitation 
Schema has been sanctioned for the rehabilitation of East Pakistan displaced person in Periyapatna taluk and not Periyapatna town. Around 800 agriculturist families settled there. It will cost about this Rs 4,000 per family. The cost of the entire scheme is borne by the Central Government. The state government for the moment has offered about 8,000 acres of land,  and we are told that the area is covered with forests. Six acres of land will be given to each family and according to the State Government, it will be quite sufficient for any agriculturist family. The scheme has been dropped.

Places of interest 

The temple of Aprameya was built in the 11th century by Chola emperor Rajendra Simha. The temple is named after the invading Chola general Aprameya. The idol of Ambegalu Navaneetha Krishna (crawling Krishna with butter in hand), is believed to be the only deity of Lord Sri Krishna in this pose. This idol was installed by Vyasaraja (aka Vyasatirtha), who was a prominent saint of Dvaita Vedanta. The famous Kriti (musical composition or song) "Jagadodharana Adisidale Yashode" was composed by most prominent composer of Carnatic music Purandaradasa in appreciation of the beauty of this idol.

Bylakuppe Tibetian settlement is located in this taluk and it is a home to around 70,000 Tibetians. The town is mainly inhabited by Tibetans who, according to a demographic survey carried out by the Central Tibetan Administration's Planning Commission in 1998, accounted for 50,727 individuals at that time. However, it is unclear whether these figures included the Vajrayana Buddhist monks living there. Today, an estimated 70,000 Tibetans live in the settlements; these were established on land leased by the state government to accommodate some of the Tibetan expatriates who came to resettle in India after 1959. Bylakuppe consists of a number of agricultural settlements, colonies are close to each other, and has number of monasteries and temples in all the major Tibetan Buddhist traditions. Most notable among them are the large educational monastic institution Sera Monastery, the smaller Tashi Lhunpo Monastery (both in the Gelug tradition) and Namdroling Monastery (in the Nyingma tradition). Bylakuppe also has many Buddhist universities for advanced Buddhist practices.

Demographics 
As per the Population Census 2011, there are total 4,031 families residing in the Piriyapatna city. The total population of Piriyapatna is 16,685 out of which 8,284 are males and 8,401 are females thus the Average Sex Ratio of Piriyapatna is 1,014.

The population of Children of age 0–6 years in Piriyapatna city is 1851 which is 11% of the total population. There are 946 male children and 905 female children between the age 0–6 years. Thus as per the Census 2011 the Child Sex Ratio of Piriyapatna is 957 which is less than Average Sex Ratio (1,014).

As per the Census 2011, the literacy rate of Piriyapatna is 80.8%. Thus Piriyapatna has higher literacy rate compared to 72.8% of Mysore district. The male literacy rate is 86.56% and the female literacy rate is 75.27% in Piriyapatna.

Vokkaliga Gowda community forms the highest population of the Taluk and majorly are tobacco cultivators. Also it is the homeland for Majority of Minor Tribal group Beda Nayakas (ST-Hunting tribal groups..also called as Valmiki Nayakas) vowing to thick Malanad forest around and Hunting being their occupation.
 India census,

Gallery

References 

Villages in Mysore district